Roberto Iezzi (born 9 July 1999) is an Italian professional footballer who plays as a right back for  club Pro Vercelli.

Club career
Formed in Martina youth system, Sangiorgi joined to Pro Vercelli in 2018, and made his first team debut for Serie C on 21 November 2018 against Alessandria. On 14 May 2021, he extended his contract with the club.

References

External links
 
 

1999 births
Living people
People from Crema, Lombardy
Footballers from Lombardy
Italian footballers
Association football defenders
Serie C players
A.S.D. Martina Calcio 1947 players
F.C. Pro Vercelli 1892 players
Sportspeople from the Province of Cremona